Cadena 94.9 is an Argentine radio station broadcasting in the 94.9 mHz from the city of Pilar, Buenos Aires. The station originally was called simply "FM 94.9", but the name was changed when it was bought by the local journalist Claudio Ponce de León. The station programming is almost entirely dedicated to the music (with a great emphasis on the 80s and 90s world pop hits), despite having a very small playlist that repeats itself once and again.

Programming
Hours are UTC-3 (UTC−2 on local Summer).

Weekdays
Music (6-7am)
Salve Argentina ("Hail Argentina", 7-9am)
El primero de la mañana ("The first one of the morning", 9am-noon) 
Live music (noon-1pm)
Vitamina M - El arte de combinar sonidos ("Vitamin M - The art of combining sounds", 1-4pm)
Años luz ("Light years", 4-6pm)
Lo mejor de "El primero de la mañana" ("The best of 'The first one of the morning'", 6-8pm)
Made in Argentina (8-10pm)
Music (10pm-midnight)
Magic night (midnight-6am)

Saturday
Music (6-10am)
La gente y su defensor ("The people and its ombudsman", 9-10am)
Music (10am-2pm)
Country 2 Radio (2-3pm)
Music (3pm-midnight)
Magic night (midnight-6am)

Sunday
Music (6am-midnight)
Magic night (midnight-6am)

Radio stations in Argentina
Broadcasting in Argentina
Mass media in Pilar, Buenos Aires